The 94th Scripps National Spelling Bee was a spelling bee that was held at Gaylord National Resort & Convention Center in National Harbor, Maryland. The finals were held on June 2, 2022, and televised on Ion Television and Bounce TV, marking the first time in 27 years that the Bee was not televised on an ESPN network. The winner of the bee was Harini Logan, an 8thgrade girl from San Antonio, Texas, who won with 22 words spelt correctly during the Bee's first spell-off round.

Field

There were 234 contestants in the field for the 2022 edition of the spelling bee, which was a modest increase over 209 spellers that competed in the year before. This year marked a return to normalcy for the bee after the past two years were affected by the COVID-19 pandemic. The youngest speller in the bee was 7year old Matthew Yi, and the most experienced speller was 13year old Akash Vukoti. 12 spellers from ages 11 to 14 made the final round, which was held on June 2, 2022.

Competition
Former Reading Rainbow host LeVar Burton hosted the spelling bee on Ion Television and Bounce TV, which broadcast every day of the event.

The spelling bee was broken up into four segments this year: preliminaries, quarterfinals, semifinals, and finals. The newly introduced word meaning competition returned for the second time. After the preliminary round, the field was already reduced from 234 to 88 spellers.

Both the quarterfinals and semifinals took place on June 1, 2022. 40 more spellers were eliminated in the quarterfinals, leaving the field at 48 spellers. The word meaning round caused many contenders to be eliminated in this round. A controversial monument came in the semifinal round when speller Surya Kapu misspelled the word leucovorin, but was reinstated after an appeal saying that he was not given enough information about a root in the word. 12 spellers remained after the semifinals.

The finals began on Thursday night at 8pm and lasted for over 3 hours. The thirdtolast speller was eliminated in Round 11, leaving 12year old Vikram Raju and 14year old Harini Logan to compete for the title. Logan had a chance to win the bee in Round 16 after Raju misspelt the word caul, but Logan was unable to correctly spell the word drimys for the championship. The two remaining competitors lasted through round 18, which is the end of the traditional competition. This meant that for the first time in the Bee's history, the winner would be determined by a "spell-off" round, where the competitors would have 90 seconds to spell as many words as they could from a predetermined list. Logan spelled 22 words correctly to Raju's 15 in the spelloff round, making Logan the 2022 champion.

Word list championship round

See also

 List of Scripps National Spelling Bee champions

References

Scripps National Spelling Bee competitions
2022 in Maryland
2022 in education